Aqueous Cream BP, also known as sorbolene, is a light, hydrocarbon-based emulsion, which is officially registered in the British Pharmacopoeia and categorised by the British National Formulary as a non-proprietary emollient preparation. It is used as a topical, external medicine, emollient moisturiser, and general-purpose substitute for toiletries such as soap, shower gel, shaving cream, and lip salve.

Ingredients

The common ingredients are:

 liquid hydrocarbons
 white soft paraffin wax
 purified water
 emulsifying wax containing sodium lauryl sulphate
 cetostearyl alcohol
 chlorocresol

Contraindications
British researchers found evidence that using the cream to moisturize areas affected by eczema may actually aggravate the condition. They suggested this was due to skin-thinning effects of a detergent sodium lauryl sulfate. The National Eczema Society recommends alternatives such as white soft paraffin wax or other types of emollient without such a high content of sodium lauryl sulfate.

References

Skin care